Holtsee is a municipality in the district of Rendsburg-Eckernförde, in Schleswig-Holstein, Germany.

The location of Holtsee is south of the municipality of Goosefeld or Altenhof, but north of Sehestedt or Lindau, and east of Haby.

References

Municipalities in Schleswig-Holstein
Rendsburg-Eckernförde